Marcelino Ugarte (1855–1929)  was an Argentine jurist and politician, who served for two terms as governor of the Province of Buenos Aires. He also served as deputy and national senator for the Province of Buenos Aires.

He was born in Buenos Aires, the son of Marcelino Ugarte and Adela Jerónima Lavalle, belonging to an aristocatric family of the City. He was married to Carolina Tomkinson Alvear, daughter of Enrique Tomkinson, born in Endon, England, and Virginia de Alvear y Sáenz de la Quintanilla, a noble lady belonging to the family of Carlos María de Alvear.

His father was Minister of Foreign Affairs of the Argentine Nation during the presidency of Bartolomé Mitre. By maternal line, he was a nephew grandson of Juan Lavalle, governor of Buenos Aires between 1828 and 1829, and descendant of Guillermo Ross, a Scottish soldier, who served as acting governor of Buenos Aires in the mid-18th century.

References 

1855 births
1929 deaths
Argentine people of Spanish descent
Argentine people of Scottish descent
Governors of Buenos Aires Province
20th-century Argentine politicians
People from Buenos Aires
Burials at La Recoleta Cemetery
Argentine legal professionals